Hume Tumse Pyaar Kitna is a 2019 Indian Hindi-language romantic thriller film produced by Mahendra Bohra and Belvie Productions. The film is financed by Jitendra Gulati and directed by Lalit Mohan; it stars Karanvir Bohra, Priya Banerjee and Sameer Kochar; and follows the limerence of Dhruv (played by Bohra) resulting from an obsessive attraction to Ananya (played by Banerjee). The film was theatrically released in India on 5 July 2019.

Cast
 Karanvir Bohra as Dhruv Mittal
 Priya Banerjee as Ananya Tripathi
 Sameer Kochar as Ranvir Dhillion 
 Mahesh Balraj
 Bhavin Bhanushali 
 Nikita Nagpal 
 Aryaveer Mehar
Mudassir Hussain
 Scarlett Wilson as an item number "Manmohini"

Production
The shooting of the film was wrapped up in April 2018 with last song shot in Mumbai.

Marketing and release
The first look poster of Karanvir Bohra from the film was unveiled on 24 May 2019.

The film was released on 5 July 2019.

Soundtrack

The film has an eponymous song from 1981 film Kudrat "Hume Tumse Pyaar Kitna", which has been recreated by Raaj Aashoo with additional lyrics by Shabbir Ahmed and sung by Shreya Ghoshal. The original was sung twice; one by Parveen Sultana and another by Kishore Kumar on composition of R. D. Burman and lyrics by Majrooh Sultanpuri under label of Saregama. Other music composers are Jeet Gannguli, Tony Kakkar, Shabbir Ahmed, DJ EMENES (MIB), Shaarib-Toshi, Background score by Amar Mohile.

Reception
Pooja Raisinghani of The Times of India praised the music, describing the film as a "few decades too late". She described Banerjee's performance as bland, but felt Bohra played his part well. Concluding she wrote, "Apart from a few thrills, the film gives you nothing to obsess over." News18 felt that the story failed to bring up the reason for protagonist's obsessive behaviour. Opining that the film needed a psychological density that could have heightened the plot's crisis line, it concluded, "This one is for fans of Karanvir Bohra who have waited to see him make a smooth transition from television to cinema. His transition is smooth in spite of the choppy waters that the plot negotiates."

References

External links
 
 

2010s Hindi-language films
Films set in Mumbai
Films shot in Mumbai
Indian romantic thriller films
2010s romantic thriller films
Films scored by Jeet Ganguly
Films scored by Sharib-Toshi
Films scored by Raaj Aashoo
Films scored by Tony Kakkar
T-Series (company) films